Walking, Walking (and also known as Keep Walking) is a 1983 Italian drama film directed by Ermanno Olmi. It was screened out of competition at the 1983 Cannes Film Festival.

Cast
 Alberto Fumagalli - Mel
 Antonio Cucciarrè - Rupo
 Eligio Martellucci - Kaipaco
 Renzo Samminiatesi - Shepher
 Marco Bartolini - Cushi
 Lucia Peccianti
 Guido Del Testa
 Tersilio Ghelardini
 Adolfo Fanucci
 Fernando Guarguaglini - Arupa
 Anna Vanni - Arupa's partner
 Giulio Paradisi - Astioge
 Rosanna Cuffaro
 Simone Migliorini - Eramo
 Stefano Ghelardini

References

External links

1983 films
1983 drama films
Italian drama films
1980s Italian-language films
Films directed by Ermanno Olmi
Films scored by Bruno Nicolai
1980s Italian films